is a Japanese environmentalist. He was awarded the Goldman Environmental Prize in 1991 for his campaign against Japan's irresponsible use of tropical hardwoods.

He was founder of the activist organization Japan Tropical Forest Action Network (JATAN).

See also
 Deforestation in Japan

References

Living people
Year of birth missing (living people)
Japanese environmentalists
Goldman Environmental Prize awardees